The Blue Lantern is a 1918 German silent drama film directed by Rudolf Biebrach and starring Henny Porten and Ferdinand von Alten.

The film's sets were designed by the art director Jack Winter.

Cast
In alphabetical order

References

Bibliography

External links

1918 films
Films of the Weimar Republic
German silent feature films
Films directed by Rudolf Biebrach
German drama films
1918 drama films
UFA GmbH films
German black-and-white films
Films based on German novels
Silent drama films
1910s German films
1910s German-language films